Gustave Peter Sapenne Delisle, known as Peter Delisle, (25 December 1934 – 12 December 2014) was an English cricketer. He played first-class cricket for Middlesex and Oxford University.

See also
 List of Middlesex County Cricket Club players
 List of Oxford University Cricket Club players

References

External links
 
 
 Obituary of Peter Delisle in 

1934 births
2014 deaths
English cricketers
Alumni of Lincoln College, Oxford
Combined Services cricketers
Marylebone Cricket Club cricketers
Middlesex cricketers
Oxford University cricketers
People from Basseterre
People educated at Stonyhurst College